Philip Hill-Pearson is a British actor. He trained at East 15 Acting School, graduating in 2009. Shortly after graduating from the drama school, he was cast as Bruce Donnelly in the comedy drama series Shameless. Following on from this, he went on to work in a range of differing television programs, including Good Cop and Doctors, and also films such as United, with David Tennant, and Steven Spielberg's adaptation of Michael Morpurgo's War Horse. Alongside his extensive work in British film and television, Pearson also worked with the Hull Truck Theatre on their stage production of The Rise and Fall of Little Voice in 2011, playing the role of Billy.

Filmography

Film

Television

References

External links
 

21st-century British male actors
Living people
British male film actors
Place of birth missing (living people)
1987 births